Juraj Chupač (born 17 March 1988) is a Slovak football central defender who currently plays for FK Dukla Banská Bystrica, on loan from TJ Tatran Krásno nad Kysucou.

External links
 
 Futbalnet profile
 MŠK Žilina profile

1988 births
Living people
Slovak footballers
Slovakia youth international footballers
Association football central defenders
FK Dubnica players
MŠK Žilina players
FK Dukla Banská Bystrica players
FC VSS Košice players
MŠK Púchov players
Slovak Super Liga players
Slovak expatriate footballers
Slovak expatriate sportspeople in the Czech Republic
Expatriate footballers in the Czech Republic